Ghirardelli is a surname. Notable people with the surname include:

Domingo Ghirardelli (1817–1894), American businessman
Stefano Ghirardelli (1633–1708), Italian Roman Catholic bishop

See also
Girardelli

Italian-language surnames